The teams competing in Group 6 of the 2015 UEFA European Under-21 Championships qualifying competition were Germany, Romania, Montenegro, Republic of Ireland and Faroe Islands.

The ten group winners and the four best second-placed teams advanced to the play-offs.

Standings

Results and fixtures
All times are CEST (UTC+02:00) during summer and CET (UTC+01:00) during winter.

Goalscorers
6 goals
 Philipp Hofmann

5 goals
 Stefan Mugoša

4 goals

 Gunnar Zachariasen
 Jonas Hofmann
 Kevin Volland
 Luka Đorđević

3 goals

 Matthew Doherty
 Aiden O'Brien

2 goals

 Moritz Leitner
 Amin Younes
 Samir Carruthers
 Claudiu Bumba
 Mădălin Martin
 Mihai Roman

1 goal

 Hørður Askham
 Árni Frederiksberg
 Poul Ingason
 Ari Jonsson
 Gilli Sørensen
 Leonardo Bittencourt
 Danny da Costa
 Robin Knoche
 Yunus Mallı
 Antonio Rüdiger
 Nico Schulz
 Niklas Stark
 Aleksandar Boljević
 Marko Vukčević
 Darko Zorić
 Anthony Forde
 Jack Grealish
 Romario Benzar
 Deian Boldor
 Sergiu Buș
 Cristian Gavra
 Gabriel Iancu
 George Pușcaș
 Florin Tănase

1 own goal
 Sørmund Kalsø (against Romania)

References

External links
Standings and fixtures at UEFA.com

Group 6